"Get Up, Get into It, Get Involved" is a funk song recorded by James Brown. It was released as a two-part single in 1970 and charted #4 R&B and #34 Pop. It features backing vocals by Bobby Byrd, who shared writing credit for the song with Brown and Ron Lenhoff. This was one of several songs by Brown with an upfront social message.

The song first received an album release on the 1973 official James Brown compilation album Soul Classics, Vol. II. Live performances of the song appear on the albums Revolution of the Mind (1971) and Love Power Peace (1992; recorded 1971).

Performers included drummer Clyde Stubblefield and guitarist Catfish Collins.

Sample used
 Big Daddy Kane – Set It Off (1988)
 BDP – "South Bronx" (1987)
 Full Force – "Ain't My Type of Hype" (1990)
 MC Shan – "Juice Crew Law"
 Public Enemy – "Brothers Gonna Work It Out" and "Can't Truss It"
 Technotronic – "Get Up! (Before the Night Is Over)" (1990)

References

James Brown songs
Songs written by James Brown
Songs written by Bobby Byrd
1970 singles
1970 songs